Medeas is a 2013 American-Italian-Mexican independent drama film directed by Andrea Pallaoro and starring Catalina Sandino Moreno and Brían F. O'Byrne.  It is Pallaoro's directorial debut.

Plot
MEDEAS is an intimate portrait of a rural family’s inner lives and their relationship to a harsh and shifting landscape. Ennis, a stern, hard-working dairy farmer struggles to maintain control of his family and surrounding environment, while his wife, Christina, retreats into herself, progressively disconnecting from him and their five children. As tensions increase, each character must confront their yearnings and anxieties, culminating in a dangerous conflict between control and freedom, intimacy, and alienation. A journey into the unpredictable boundaries of human behavior, MEDEAS explores the desperate lengths people are driven to by love and self-preservation.

Cast
Catalina Sandino Moreno as Christina
Brían F. O'Byrne as Ennis
Mary Mouser as Ruth
Ian Nelson as Micah
Maxim Knight as Jacob
Jake Vaughn as Jonas
Kevin Alejandro as Noah
Patrick Birkett as Tobias
Angel Amaral as Adam
Tara Buck as Ada
Granville Ames as Carl

Reception
The film has an 80% approval rating on Rotten Tomatoes based on 10 reviews, with an average score of 6.71/10.  Nick Prigge of Slant Magazine gave the film three stars out of four.  Orlando Weekly gave it four stars out of five.  Glenn Kenny of RogerEbert.com gave it two stars.

See also

List of films featuring the deaf and hard of hearing

References

External links
 
 

American drama films
American independent films
Italian independent films
Italian drama films
English-language Italian films
Mexican drama films
English-language Mexican films
Mexican independent films
2013 directorial debut films
2013 films
2013 drama films
2010s English-language films
Films directed by Andrea Pallaoro
2010s American films
2010s Mexican films
2013 independent films